Cucullia postera is a species of moth in the family Noctuidae (the owlet moths). It is found in North America.

The MONA or Hodges number for Cucullia postera is 10198.

References

Further reading

External links

 

Cucullia
Articles created by Qbugbot
Moths described in 1852